Masters of Chant III is the fourth album by Gregorian.

Track listing 

Bonus tracks
 "Voyage Voyage 2002" (featuring Amelia Brightman)
 "Ouragan" (Romano Musumarra) (original by Princess Stéphanie of Monaco)
 "Juste Quelques Hommes" (Jean-Jacques Goldman) (original by Jean-Jacques Goldman)

Production
Producer – Carsten Heusmann, Jan-Eric Kohrs, and Michael Soltau
Engineer – Volker Heintzen and John Timperly
Assistant Engineer – Tom Jenkins
Mixing – Jan-Eric Kohrs, Carsten Heusmann, and Michael Soltau

Personnel

Vocals
Richard "Naxos" Naxton, Johnny Clucas, Dan Hoadley, Chris Tickner, Richard Collier, Gerry O'Beime, Gunther Laudahn, Lawrence "Lorro" White, Jan-Eric Kohrs, Rob Fardell
Voyage Voyage (original version) by Sarah Brightman
Voyage Voyage 2002 by Amelia Brightman

Musicians
Keyboards, Programming, Arrangements – Carsten Heusmann, Jan-Eric Kohrs, and Michael Soltau
Guitars – Gunther Laudahn and Peter Weihe
Strings Arranger and Conductor – Stefan Pintev

Certifications and sales

References

2002 albums
Covers albums
Gregorian (band) albums